Amy Gulick is an American nature and wildlife photographer. She is one of the founding Fellows of the International League of Conservation Photographers

Her award-winning images have been featured in many magazines, including publications of the National Audubon Society, National Wildlife Federation, National Parks Conservation Association and the Sierra Club, as well as Nature's Best Photography magazine.

In 2001 she published an Internet journal about her three-week photography expedition to the Arctic National Wildlife Refuge. This effort won a Lowell Thomas Travel Journalism Award presented by the Society of American Travel Writers Foundation in 2002.

She has also received the Daniel Houseberg Wilderness Image Award from the Alaska Conservation Foundation and was awarded a Phillip Hyde grant from the North American Nature Photography Association.

In 2010 she published Salmon in the Trees: Life in Alaska's Tongass Rainforest, a book containing her photographs, along with stories from people who live in the area. The book has been called "a great achievement in environmental photography and ecology."

See also
 Nature photography
 Conservation photography

References

External links
 Amy Gulick's official web site
 Salmon in the Trees web site
 ILCP website

Photographers from Washington (state)
Living people
Nature photographers
Artists from Seattle
American women photographers
Year of birth missing (living people)
21st-century American women